The manananggal is a mythical creature in the Philippines that separates from their lower part of its body and their fangs and wings give it a vampire-like appearance.

Mythology
The manananggal is described as scary, often hideous, usually depicted as female, and always capable of severing its upper torso and sprouting huge bat-like wings to fly into the night in search of its victims. The word manananggal comes from the Tagalog word tanggal, which means "to remove" or "to separate", which literally translates as "remover" or "separator".  In this case, "one who separates itself".  The name also originates from an expression used for a severed torso.

The manananggal is said to favor preying on sleeping, pregnant women, using an elongated proboscis-like tongue to suck the hearts of fetuses, or the blood of someone who is sleeping. It also haunts newlyweds or couples in love.  Due to being left at the altar, grooms-to-be are one of its main targets. The severed lower torso is left standing, and is the more vulnerable of the two halves. Sprinkling salt, smearing crushed garlic or ash on top of the standing torso is fatal to the creature. The upper torso then would not be able to rejoin itself and would perish by sunrise.

The myth of the manananggal is popular in the Visayan regions of the Philippines, especially in the western provinces of Capiz, Iloilo, Bohol and Antique. There are varying accounts of the features of a manananggal. Like vampires, Visayan folklore creatures, and aswangs, manananggals are also said to abhor garlic, salt and holy water. They were also known to avoid daggers, light, vinegar, spices and the tail of a stingray, which can be fashioned as a whip. Folklore of similar creatures can be found in the neighbouring nations of Indonesia and Malaysia. The province of Capiz is the subject or focus of many manananggal stories, as with the stories of other types of mythical creatures, such as ghosts, goblins, ghouls generically referred to as aswangs. Sightings are purported here, and certain local folk are said to believe in their existence despite modernization. The manananggal shares some features with the vampire of Balkan folklore, such as its dislike of garlic, salt, and vulnerability to sunlight.

Historical accounts

"The seventh was called magtatangal, and his purpose was to show himself at night to many persons, without his head or entrails. In such wise the devil walked about and carried, or pretended to carry, his head to different places; and, in the morning, returned it to his body—remaining, as before, alive. This seems to me to be a fable, although the natives affirm that they have seen it, because the devil probably caused them so to believe. This occurred in Catanduanes." 

Fr. Juan de Plasencia, Customs of the Tagalogs (1589)

"Brujo. Magtatangal. Dicen que vuela y come carne humana pero cuando levanta el vuelo no lleva mas que el medio cuerpo y por eso se llma asi porque es de tangal que es desencajar y el tal desencaja la mitad del cuerpo y ese lleva consigo dejadose en casa el otro medio." Magtatangal. A witch. They say that it flies and eats human flesh, but when it flies, it only has half its body, and that is why it is called tangal because it is tangible and can disengage and he dislodges half of his body, and he carries the other means at home.

Fray Domingo de los Santos, Vocabulario de Lengua Tagala (1703)

Appearances in film and other media

 Manananggal (1927), directed by José Nepomuceno, was the first ever Filipino horror movie. It is a silent movie starring Mary Walter portraying the manananggal in its current form, having the upper torso detach. Not much is known of the film's plot.
 Manananggal vs. Mangkukulam (1960), directed by Consuelo Osorio, is a Lea Productions horror comedy starring Pugo, Lopito, Patsy, Chichay and Aruray.
 Mga Bata ng Lagim (1964), again by Consuelo Osorio, features 1960s teen matinee idols "Sampaguita-VP All-Stars". It feature a prominent scene where German Moreno and Boy Alano turn into a manananggal after applying oil to their bodies, after which they sing the popular paruparong bukid folksong.
 In Lipad, Darna, Lipad! (1973),directed by Maning Borlaza, Gloria Romero plays the respectable teacher Miss Luna, who is secretly a manananggal. It co-stars Vilma Santos.
 In Pagsapit ng Dilim (1975), Perla Bautista plays a mother who tricks her daughter Gina Pareño into becoming a manananggal as part of her coming of age rites.
 Shake, Rattle & Roll (1984) is the first in a series of horror anthology films. In one episode, directed by Peque Gallaga, Herbert Bautista plays a teenager in a faraway province. A manananggal is said to live within the vicinity and is out to eat people. He is given the task by his grandmother to kill this creature. Having found a way to prevent it from returning to its body, he must now survive the night to protect his family from the creature's attacks. It co-stars Irma Alegre and Mary Walter.
 In Impaktita (1989), Jean Garcia plays the role of a young girl whose mother is a manananggal. When she turns 18, she transforms into a wild bloodsucking creature at night by the eerie sound of a bat and sucks the blood of any living person she can find. Other stars include Richard Gomez, Aga Muhlach, Gloria Romero, and Nida Blanca.
 In one episode of Shake, Rattle & Roll IV (1992), a homeless family and their neighbors in the city of Manila are plagued by attacks from a manananggal. A little boy (IC Mendoza) suspects a nun (Aiko Melendez) to be that creature, but no one believes him. He finds himself racing to prove his suspicions before he becomes the monster's next victim.
 Takot Ka Ba Sa Dilim? (1996) features a brief scene where Marjorie Barretto plays a young woman who turns into a ravenous manananggal at night who hunts for unsuspecting victims. Other cast members include Angelu de Leon, Rica Peralejo, Bobby Andrews, Red Sternberg, and Amanda Page.
 In Manananggal in Manila (1997), an English-speaking manananggal (Alma Concepcion) spreads terror in Manila.
 Banzai Girl is a 2002 graphic novel series created, written, and drawn by Filipino artist and model Jinky Coronado. Its main character (also named Jinky Coronado) is a seemingly ordinary schoolgirl, but has a mysterious connection to two other realities. When her worlds begin to collide, she is forced to battle various monsters, including a vicious manananggal.
 Dayo: Sa Mundo ng Elementalia (2008) is an animated film directed by Robert Quilao whose plot revolves around Bubuy (Nash Aguas) who is out to save his abducted grandparents in the land of Elementalia. It features a friendly vegetarian manananggal named Anna (Katrina Legaspi), relating her to a different species of bat which is a fruit bat, as opposed the blood thirsty ones based on the folklore. Pokwang co-stars.
 Michael Deforge's comics anthology Lose #3 includes a three page wordless comic entitled "Manananggal". 
 In Episode 5, "Island Lights" (The Island of Fire) of Marvel Anime: Blade (2011), Blade and his partners encounter a mutated version of the manananggal and its victims while hunting down Deacon Frost on the island of Siquijor, an island province in the Philippines.
 The Aswang Phenomenon (2011), directed by Jordan Clark, is a documentary exploration of the aswang folklore and its effects on Philippine society. The evolution and history of the manananggal is explored from an anthropological, sexual and pop culture view. Produced by High Banks Entertainment Ltd., the cast includes Peque Gallaga, Rodolfo Vera, and Maricel Soriano.
 In the TV series Aso ni San Roque (2012), directed by Don Michael Perez, Fatima (Mona Louise Rey) is a blind girl with a heart of gold who is the offspring of a mortal and a manananggal. Her fate is to end the devastation of the Aswang in the human world with the help of Anghel, the dog statue of San Roque that has miraculously animated. It features Kanlaon (Gardo Versoza), the manananggal leader of the Aswang of the Wind (or Airborne aswangs). He once loved and failed to Lourdes (LJ Reyes), a manananggal herself and the mother of Fatima.
Fresh Meat (2013), a novel tie-in to the TV series Supernatural by Alice Henderson, features the main characters battling an aswang in the Sierra Nevada mountains during a blizzard. The creature in this novel sucks human organs out through a proboscis and inserts body parts of other humans into the victim then seals the hole. The main characters make a whip tipped with a stingray barb and coated with spices to kill the creature.
In Midnight Blue-Light Special (2013), the second volume of the InCryptid series by Seanan McGuire, the protagonist Verity Price slays a manananggal in a hospital.
 Mananang Game (2014) is an Android game by Jigzen Game Studios similar to Flappy Bird, featuring a manananggal.
 The episode "Si Esperanza, Ang Rebeldeng Manananggal" ("Esperanza, The Rebel Manananggal")  (2014) of the Philippine TV series Elemento is about Esperanza (Glaiza de Castro), a pediatrician with two mortal sons, her desire to protect her children and avoid the way of the life of being a manananggal. The episode is directed by Topel Lee and co-stars Valerie Concepcion and Maria Isabel Lopez.
 Nightfall: Escape (2016) by Zeenoh is the first ever Filipino horror game, a first-person survival horror video game featuring a manananggal as the main antagonist.
 In Mommy Dearest (Grimm), the 14th episode of Season 3 of the supernatural drama television series Grimm and the 58th episode overall, which premiered on March 7, 2014, on the broadcast network NBC, features an "Aswang", attacking Wu's pregnant childhood friend from the Philippines. It turns out Wu's friend married into a family of aswangs and the one attacking her is her mother-in-law, who claims she will die if she does not eat her first grandchild.
 Ang Manananggal sa Unit 23B, a Horror Romantic movie made in 2016 and had its cinema screening in 2017, focuses on a love story of a woman by day and Manananggal by night. It features the actress Ryza Cenon as the manananggal and actor Martin Del Rosario as her love interest.
 "Deadly Vows" by Keri Arthur has a manananggal which is terrorizing newlyweds in the Castle Rock reservation.
 In the game Shin Megami Tensei V, Manananggal was revealed as a new demon and the first representative of Filipino folklore for the Shin Megami Tensei series.
 In the erotic novel Melania: Devourer of Men (2018) by J.D. Boehninger, Melania Trump is a secret manananggal who struggles to keep her identity hidden after her husband becomes president. 
 In the short story M by Sarah Hall (published in Sudden Traveller 2019) the protagonist turns into a creature that fits the description of the manananggal though this is not overtly stated. 
 The graphic novel Kasama (2021) by Allan Matudio prominently features a manananggal as a main antagonist.

Other terms and versions
 Aswang: However, aswang is a generic term and can refer to all types of monsters (usually ghouls, werebeasts, and vampires) and witches (mangkukulam), etc.
 Tik-tik: Manananggals are sometimes referred to as tik-tik, the sound it makes while flying.  Folklore dictates that the fainter the sound, the nearer the manananggal is. This is to confuse the victim. Black cats and crows often signal a tik-tik's presence, and deformed faces or bodies in children are allegedly signs of the aftermath of a tik-tik attack.

See also
 Chonchon – Mapuche creature that also detaches its head
 Krasue – Floating vampiric female head and entrails that is similar to a manananggal
 Nukekubi – Japanese creature that also detaches its head to feed on victims
 Penanggalan – A vampire akin to Manananggal from the Malay peninsula
 Leyak – Similar creature from Balinese mythology
 Philippine mythology
 Soucouyant – a Caribbean blood-sucking hag
 Tiyanak – Blood-sucking creature in a form of a baby that turns into what is known to be the child of the devil

References

Further reading

External links
 Filipino Folklore: Manananggal
 Mananang Game Official Website

Vampires
Female legendary creatures
Mythological anthropophages
Mythological hematophages
Malaysian legendary creatures
Philippine legendary creatures
Philippine demons
Visayan mythology
Ghouls